The Military ranks of the Bulgarian People's Army were the military insignia used by the Bulgarian People's Army. Being a Marxist–Leninist one–party socialist republic, and a country that was traditionally close to the Soviet Union, the Bulgaria People's Army shared a similar design of insignia to those of the Soviet Union.

Commissioned officer ranks 
The rank insignia of commissioned officers.

Other ranks 
The rank insignia of non-commissioned officers and enlisted personnel.

References 
Citations

Bibliography

External links 
 

Bulgaria, People's Army
Bulgarian People's Army